The British Royal Navy purchased HMS Nile on 3 November 1806. She was the hired armed cutter Nile. After a brief, undistinguished career, the Navy sold her in 1810 only to have to break her up in 1811.

Career
Between 15 November 1806 and 13 January 1807 Nile was at Portsmouth undergoing repairs. Lieutenant James Lloyd had commissioned her in November 1806.

On 12 February  was wrecked off the Île de Ré, near Rochefort. She had been cruising to watch enemy vessels in Rochefort when she hit the Grande Blanche rock. Despite attempts to lighten her that included cutting away her masts, she continued to founder. At daybreak three British vessels approached and took off the crew, enduring fire from shore batteries as they did so.

Lloyd proved a disappointment. 

Within 1807, Lieutenant Thomas Johnson, who had commanded the hired armed cutter Nile, replaced Lloyd. Unfortunately, Johnson was imprisoned for smuggling.

Lieutenant Symons replaced Johnson for the Channel, but on 4 December Symons sailed for the Mediterranean. On 25 December 1807 she captured Industry. At about the same time, Nile also detained, and sent into Dartmouth Æolus, Angel, master, which had been sailing from Caediz to St Petersburg.

At end-April 1809 Symons brought Nile into Falmouth with dispatches from Lisbon and Seville. These were rushed overland to London. Nile then sailed to Plymouth.

Fate
The "Principal Officers and Commissioners of His Majesty's Navy" sold Nile on 18 October 1810. However the purchaser withdrew from the sale. The Navy then broke her up at Plymouth in November 1811.

Citations

References
 
Publications of the Navy Records Society (1904), Vol. 28. (Navy Records Society).
 

1800s ships
Cutters of the Royal Navy